Max L. Bowler (March 9, 1881–April 26, 1949) was an American politician and businessman.

Bowler was born in Edwardsville, Illinois. In 1883, he moved with his family to East St. Louis, Illinois. Bowler went to the East St. Louis public schools and took commercial training at Perkins and Herpel Business School in St. Louis, Missouri. Bowler was involved with the livestock business at the National Stock Yards in Illinois. He served on the St. Clair Board of Supervisors and was a Republican. Bowler was served in the Illinois House of Representatives in 1941 and 1942. He died at his home in East St. Louis, Illinois from heart disease.

Notes

1881 births
1949 deaths
People from East St. Louis, Illinois
People from Edwardsville, Illinois
American cattlemen
Businesspeople from Illinois
County board members in Illinois
Republican Party members of the Illinois House of Representatives
20th-century American politicians
20th-century American businesspeople